Khatereh Parvaneh (1930 – November 5, 2008 in Persian: خاطره پروانه) was an Iranian singer who specialized in traditional classical music.

Biography 
Parvaneh was the daughter of Banoo Machol Parvaneh, a royal court singer in Iran from the Qajar era. Her mother died when Parvaneh was four, though the songs she learned from her mother formed the basis of her love of singing. Parvaneh's husband also encouraged her singing after their marriage. She would sing the national anthem at when teaching school, leading to her eventually being discovered by musician, Abolhassan Saba in 1957. 

Parvaneh sings traditional Iranian music. Her singing was described as "liquid-voiced" by the Idaho State Journal. Parvaneh performed at the Fajr Music Festival in 2006 and 2007.

Parvaneh died in her home in Tehran on November 5, 2008.

References

External links 
Dastgah of Shour Katereh Parvaneh

1930 births
2008 deaths
20th-century Iranian women singers
Women singers on Golha